"Little Things" is a song by rock band Bush, released on 30 May 1995 as the second single from their 1994 debut album, Sixteen Stone.

Composition

In a November 2017 interview with Songfacts, Gavin Rossdale explained the song's inspiration:

Music video
The video was shot throughout January and February 1995 in an old mansion in Long Island, NY,
and Los Angeles, and at the band's studio. The video was directed by Matt Mahurin who also directed their previous video for "Everything Zen"

Track listing
AUS CD single 92531 / INTDS95757 (both bardsleeve and jewelcase versions)
"Little Things" - 4:25
"Swim [Live]" - 6:39
"X-Girlfriend" - 0:47

Charts

Weekly charts

Year-end charts

References

1994 songs
1995 singles
Bush (British band) songs
Songs written by Gavin Rossdale
Grunge songs
Song recordings produced by Clive Langer
Song recordings produced by Alan Winstanley
Interscope Records singles
Trauma Records singles